The 1924 United States presidential election in Indiana took place on November 4, 1924, as part of the 1924 United States presidential election which was held throughout all contemporary 48 states. Voters chose 15 representatives, or electors to the Electoral College, who voted for president and vice president. 

Indiana voted for the Republican nominee, incumbent President Calvin Coolidge of Massachusetts, over the Democratic nominee, Ambassador John W. Davis of West Virginia. Coolidge ran with former Budget Director Charles G. Dawes of Illinois, while Davis ran with Governor Charles W. Bryan of Nebraska. Also in the running that year was the Progressive Party nominee, Senator Robert M. La Follette of Wisconsin and his running mate Senator Burton K. Wheeler of Montana. However, owing to Indiana’s strong Southern leanings, the conservatism of its German Catholic counties, and the dominance of the Ku Klux Klan, the state was one of La Follette’s weakest nationally.

Coolidge won the state by a margin of 16.56%; however, Indiana was easily Davis’ strongest antebellum free state, voting around 9 points more Democratic than the nation at-large.  this is the last occasion Indiana has voted more Democratic than the nation, as well as more Democratic than neighboring Illinois.

Results

Results by county

See also
 United States presidential elections in Indiana

Notes

References

Indiana
1924